

Events
September 24 – The Bolshoi Theatre Company hosts its first annual opera season, with the opening of the Bolshoi Kamenny Theatre in St Petersburg.
 Giovanni Paisiello is invited to the court of Catherine the Great, where he will stay for eight years.
Court Theatre in Stockholm built by King Gustav III of Sweden

Popular music
Daniel Dow – "Money Musk"
Psalms and Hymns for Public and Private Worship by Augustus Montague Toplady

Opera
Gaetano Marinelli – Il Barone di Sardafritta
Giovanni Paisiello – Il finto spettro (December 26, Mannheim)
Ignaz Pleyel – Die Fee Urgele
Antonio Tozzi – Le Due Gemelli
Tommaso Traetta – Germondo

Classical music
Carl Philipp Emanuel Bach 
6 Keyboard Trios, Wq.89
3 Keyboard Trios, Wq.90
Johann Christian Bach – Die Amerikanerin
Luigi Boccherini – 6 String Quintets, G.277-282 (Op.13)
Felice Giardini – String Quartet in E-flat major
William Goodwin – Voluntary XII in D major
François Joseph Gossec – Symphonie de chasse; Symphonie en ré
Johann Wilhelm Hässler – 6 Keyboard Sonatas
James Hook – The Ascension (oratorio)
Wolfgang Amadeus Mozart – Haffner Serenade, K.250
Joseph Haydn – Symphony No. 61, Hob.I:61
Juliane Reichardt – An den Mond
Antonio Salieri – La Passione di Nostro Signore Gesù Cristo für Soli, vierstimmigen Chor und Orchester
Carl Stamitz – 6 Quartets, Op. 14
Daniel Gottlob Türk – 6 Keyboard Sonatas, Sammlung 1

Methods and theory writings 

 Charles Burney – A General History of Music, vol. 1 (vol. 2 published 1782, vols. 3 and 4 in 1789)
 John Hawkins – A General History of the Science and Practice of Music

Births
January 24 – Ernst Theodor Amadeus Hoffmann, author and composer
February 18 – John Parry, composer
February 21 – Vincenzo Lavigna, composer
March 31 – Joseph Küffner, composer (died 1856)
April 8 – Thaddaus Weigl, composer
April 27 – Hyacinthe Jadin, composer (died 1800)
May 10 – George Thomas Smart, composer
May 12 – Juan Bros y Bertomel, composer
May 13 – Charles Ots and Rodrigo Ferreira da Costa, composers
June 1 – John George Schetky, composer
August 4 – Wenzel Sedlak, composer
August 15 – Ignaz Xaver von Seyfried, composer
August 16 – Philipp Jakob Riotte, composer
August 19 – Johan Peter Strömberg, dancer and theatre director
August 29 – Georg Friedrich Treitschke, librettist (died 1842)
December 6 – Paul Friedrich Struck, composer

Deaths
February 13 – Luis Misón, composer, 50
April 22 – Johann Adolph Scheibe, music theorist, 67
May 6 – James Kent, composer, 76
June 10 – Leopold Widhalm, luthier, 53
November 29 – Zanetta Farussi, opera singer, 69
date unknown 
Thomas Capell, organist (date of birth unknown)
Josep Carcoler, composer, 78
Aaron Williams, composer, 45. 
probable – Matteo Capranica, composer

References

 
18th century in music
Music by year